= Western Australia an official handbook =

Multiple edition government handbook about Western Australia

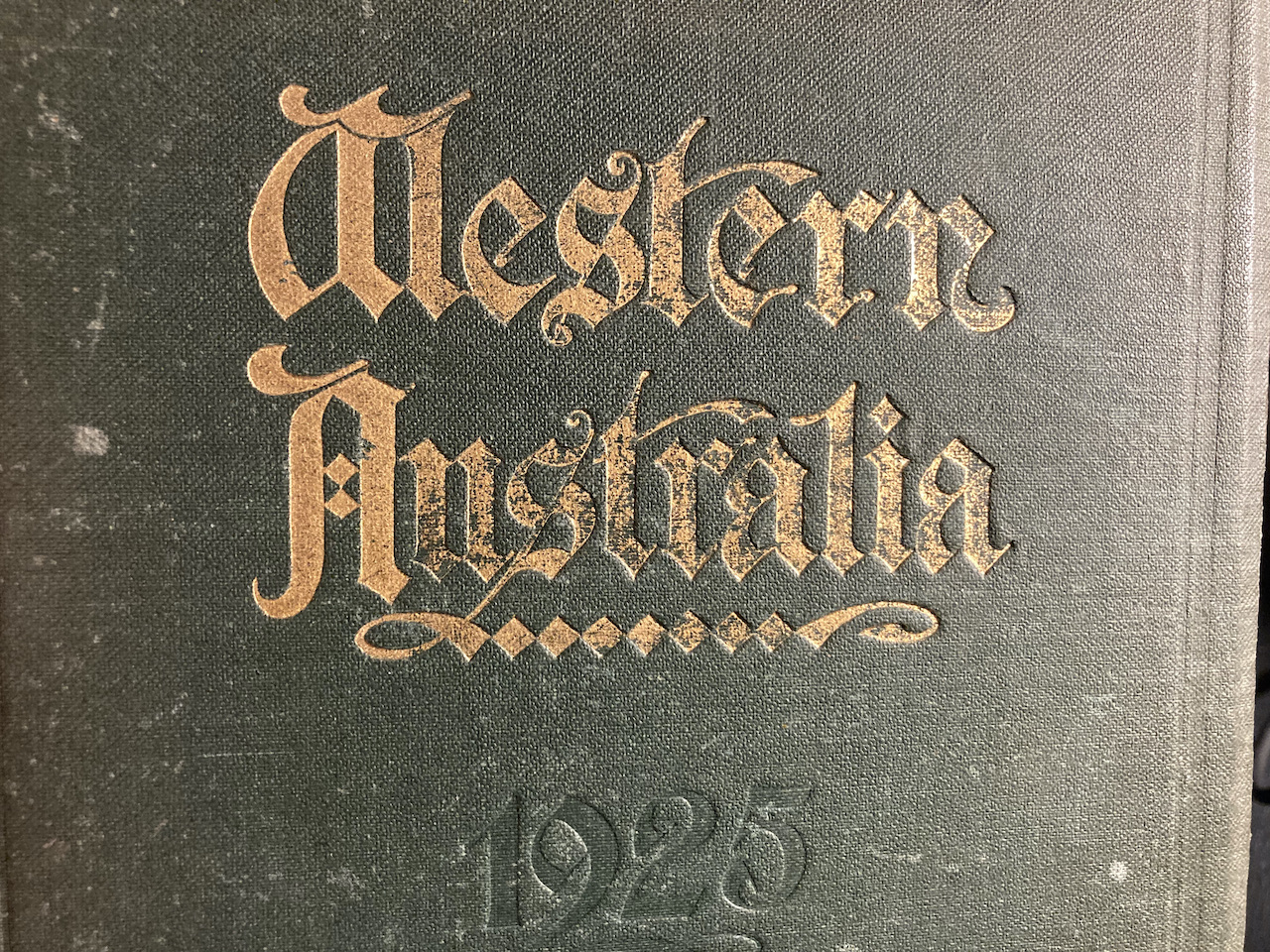
Part of cover of 1925 edition

Western Australia an official handbook for The Information of Commercial Men, Migrants, and Tourists was a government publication that was produced by the government in the 1890s and 1920s in Western Australia.

- 1891/1892 edition
- 1900 edition, produced for the Paris Exposition
- 1912 edition
- 1925 edition

The contents were arranged:

- Physical features and history
- State's awakening
- Western Australia today
- Climate
- Land and its characteristics
- Growth of land settlement
- Agriculture generally
- Wheat farming
- Dairying and allied industries
- Fruit growing
- Viticulture and wine-making
- Pastoral
- Forestry
- Mining
- Fish and fisheries
- Pearls and pearlshell
- Our great North-West
- Secondary industries
- Water conservation
- Perth the capital city
- Ports, Communication by land water and air
- Education
- Western Australia for the migrant
- Tourist resorts
- Aboriginals
- Wildflowers

Similar titles in the same era included non governmental items with very close sounding items:

- A handbook to Western Australia and its gold-fields : being a guide to the resources (agricultural, mineral and miscellaneous) of the colony, and a collection of hints to the intending immigrant
